Dinetus is a genus of predatory wasps belonging to the family Crabronidae.

Species 
 Dinetus arabicus H. Jacobs, 2021
 Dinetus arenarius Kazenas, 1973
 Dinetus cereolus Morice, 1897
 Dinetus dentipes E. Saunders, 1910
 Dinetus deserticus H. Jacobs, 2021
 Dinetus hameri Notton, 2020
 Dinetus jordanicus H. Jacobs, 2021
 Dinetus nabataeus de Beaumont, 1960
 Dinetus pictus (Fabricius, 1793)
 Dinetus politus Turner, 1917
 Dinetus porcellaneus Guichard, 1980
 Dinetus psammophilus Kazenas, 1977
 Dinetus pulawskii de Beaumont, 1960
 Dinetus rakhimovi Mokrousov & Khedher, 2020
 Dinetus schmideggeri H. Jacobs, 2021
 Dinetus simplicipes E. Saunders, 1910
 Dinetus tunisiensis Khedher & Mokrousov, 2020
 Dinetus turanicus Kazenas, 1993
 Dinetus vanharteni H. Jacobs, 2021
 Dinetus venustus de Beaumont, 1957
 Dinetus wojciechi Kazenas, 1998

References

Crabronidae
Hymenoptera genera